The 2012 Honolulu Challenger was a professional tennis tournament played on hard courts. It was the third edition of the tournament which was part of the 2012 ATP Challenger Tour. It took place in Honolulu, United States between 23 and 29 January 2012.

Singles main-draw entrants

Seeds

 Rankings are as of January 16, 2012.

Other entrants
The following players received wildcards into the singles main draw:
  Alex Kuznetsov
  Dennis Lajola
  Leo Rosenberg 
  Jack Sock

The following player received entry as an alternate into the singles main draw:
  Blake Strode

The following players received entry from the qualifying draw:
  Takanyi Garanganga
  Kevin Kim
  Michael McClune
  Olivier Sajous

Champions

Singles

 Go Soeda def.  Robby Ginepri, 6–3, 7–6(7–5)

Doubles

 Amer Delić /  Travis Rettenmaier def.  Nicholas Monroe /  Jack Sock 6–4, 7–6(7–3)

References

External links
Official Website
ITF Search
ATP official site

Honolulu Challenger
Honolulu Challenger
Challenger
ATP Challengers in Hawaii
Honolulu Challenger
Honolulu Challenger